Cambes may refer to several communes in France:

 Cambes, Gironde, in the Gironde département 
 Cambes, Lot, in the Lot département 
 Cambes, Lot-et-Garonne, in the Lot-et-Garonne département 
 Cambes-en-Plaine, in the Calvados département